Stacey Cadman (born 23 May 1979) is a British actress and television presenter.

Biography
She was born and educated in the West Midlands, England. After leaving John Willmott School in Sutton Coldfield, Stacey studied performing arts and Dance in Birmingham. She followed this with a course in Musical theatre at The Arts Educational Schools in London.

She was chosen from hundreds of actresses for the leading role in the BBC TV series Cavegirl. After filming two series in the wilds of South Africa, she was then picked for the role of Poppy Fields in Sky One's series Mile High. Shortly afterwards she also appeared as Bling in the series Blessed written and directed by Ben Elton.

As well as Channel 4's Monster Jam 2005 series she has also co-presented Smile and The Saturday Show. She is an accomplished dancer, personal trainer and 2nd Dan kickboxer with PKA kickboxing where she was an instructor.

Cadman also appeared as Mandy Rice Davies in Keeler, directed by Paul Nicholas, at Upstairs at the Gatehouse North London until 18 March 2007.  Other notable theatrical roles include Ella Reed in The Bed Before Yesterday at The Mill at Sonning and Wendy in Amy Leach's Peter Pan at The Dukes Theatre, Lancaster.

Cadman took part in Sky One's reality show Cirque de Celebrité where she was in the final and came second to Australian actor Kyal Marsh.

After this, she went to the City University of London and got a BA Hons in Performance Studies and then completed a graduate teaching qualification from the Institute of Education.

Stacey now works at Hurtwood House. She lives in Surrey with her husband and two children.

Filmography
 Casualty
 Blessed
 Love Soup
 Mile High
 Cavegirl
 Cirque de Celebrite

References

External links
 
 Cirque de Celebrite news story
 Songs of My Life 2020 Isolation Radio Mixcloud  Songs of my Life

1979 births
Living people
People educated at the Arts Educational Schools
British actresses
Alumni of the University of London